The K21 is a South Korean infantry fighting vehicle. A replacement for the K200-series, it was formerly designated as K300 or XK21 KNIFV (Korea Next-generation Infantry Fighting Vehicle). The initial production began in 2009, with the Republic of Korea Army planning to field approximately 466 units. It is designed to effectively defeat other IFVs as heavily armed and armored as the BMP-3.

History
Development began in 1999.  A $77 million contract was awarded to Doosan DST for the NIFV prototype in 2003.  Three prototype vehicles were delivered to the ROK Army in 2005.  A contract for the first batch of K21 vehicles was signed in October 2008 worth $386.7 million.  Production began in November 2009 after a ten-year development period.  K21s will be deployed from 2013 through 2016.

Design

Construction
The K21 KNIFV's chassis is constructed entirely out of aluminium with certain parts, like hatches, made of fiberglass, reducing the weight of the vehicle and enabling it to travel at higher speeds without bulky and powerful engines. The NIFV is to be lighter than other IFVs, including the American Bradley series, increasing both speed and payload.

The design was finally deemed production-ready in 2009, following 10 years in development and a research budget expenditure of approximately USD $80 million. More than 85% of the vehicle's design is domestic. However a redesign is in order following the sinking of two vehicles while engaged in amphibious operations. A board of inquiry found that the problem was a lack of buoyancy, a malfunctioning wave plate, and a technical problem with the drain pump, all of which are to be corrected in the new design.

Armaments

The two-man turret on the K21 is armed with an S&T Dynamics K40 40 mm cannon. The K40 40 mm automatic gun was developed based on the design of the Nobong 40 mm twin naval cannon, which was developed to replace the OTO Melara DARDO CIWS, which was serviced by the South Korean Navy, capable of firing APFSDS, high-explosive, smoke and multipurpose munitions, and a 7.62 mm machine gun. This is combined with an advanced fire-control system and gun stabilizer usually found on third-generation main battle tanks that makes the K21, together with the German Puma, able to move and engage the targets with high degree of accuracy at the same time. The ammunition for the autocannon is stored under the turret.

The multipurpose munition (한글: 복합기능탄) has several modes including proximity, air burst, armour-piercing and fragmentation. The mode is configured by the K21's FCS, which then transmits the necessary data to a small programmable fuse system inside the round before it is fired. This allows more control over the trajectory and impact of the round, expanding the scope of possible targets from medium armored vehicles to aircraft and infantry personnel.

Sensors
IFF sensors are also present. The vehicle also has hunter-killer capabilities with its separate commander's sight (IFV Commander's Panoramic Sight or ICPS) and gunner's sight (IFV Gunner's Primary Sight or IGPS), which can detect both ground and aerial targets. The sights are designed by Samsung Thales.

The gunner's sight is equipped with a third generation thermal viewer and a 1.54 μm laser rangefinder. It can detect targets from 6,000 meters away and identify them from 3,000 meters away. The commander's sight is equipped with the same system as the gunner's. This allows the gunner to use the commander's sight to engage targets if his own sight is disabled or destroyed. The commander of the vehicle also has the ability to override the command to take control of the turret and gun from the gunner.

Armour
Although not much is known about the composition of the K21's armour, the frontal armour of the vehicle is specifically designed to protect against large caliber automatic cannon rounds, primarily the 30 mm APDS munitions (30×165mm) for 2A72 automatic cannon used on BMP-3, which has approximately  armour penetration at ranges of 1,000 m. The side armour is designed to protect against 14.5 mm AP rounds, which have approximately  armour penetration at 1,000 m. The top can withstand fragments from 152 mm artillery shells exploding as close as 10 meters. It has been confirmed that the composite armour comprises S2-glass fibre and Al2O3 ceramic including lightweight aluminium alloy.

The vehicle has a soft self-sealing fuel tank that can absorb the impact of a projectile. There is also an automatic fire suppression system inside the vehicle to extinguish any internal fires that might erupt.

The K21 PIP (Product Improvement Program) will include an active protection suite and hard-kill anti-missile system similar to the AWiSS that will also be utilized for the K2 PIP. This will increase the vehicle's ability to defend itself against various ATGMs.

Troop deployment
The K21 is able to carry a total of 9 passengers and 3 more vehicle crew members. With the Battle Management System, the vehicle crew and passengers inside the vehicle can be instantly notified about the environment around them, improving their situational awareness. A  screen is installed inside the passenger compartment, which provides various data from the BMS. The vehicle is mounted with an external CCD camera, and the passengers inside can survey the environment using the same screen.

Mobility

The K21 is equipped with a turbocharged Doosan D2840LXE V-10 diesel engine. The vehicle weight is approximately 25.6 tonnes which, combined with the total output of the engine, gives it a power/weight ratio of approximately 29 hp/t. The K21 PIP will feature an improved version of the engine that will give the vehicle an increased power of 840 hp.

A newly developed semi-active ISU, or In-arm Suspension Unit, is available for the K21. The same unit is to be used on the K2 Black Panther. Despite having the same ISU used on the K2 Black Panther, the K21 cannot change its posture.

The vehicle can travel on both land and water. A pontoon system gives more buoyancy to float on water when additional weight is put on to the vehicle.

Pricing
The average cost per unit is approximately ₩3.95 billion ($3.5 million USD) (2014).

Variants

Light tank
Doosan DST and Belgian firm Cockerill joined together in early 2013 to develop the Cockerill XC-8 turret for the K21 to provide a medium weight direct fire capability. The XC-8 is based on the Cockerill CT-CV 105HP turret and is fitted with a 105 mm or 120 mm gun. The 105 mm version fires all NATO 105 mm ammunition and can also use the Cockerill Falarick 105 Gun-Launched Anti-Tank Guided Missile (GLATGM). The 120 mm version fires all NATO 120 mm ammunition and can utilize the Cockerill Falarick 120 GLATGM. The missile can engage heavy armor beyond . Both turrets have a two-man crew, are autoloaded, and are digital, fully stabilized, day/night weapon systems.

In 2014, CMI Defence and Doosan DST publicly revealed the K21-105, a light tank version of the K21 chassis fitted with a CMI Defence CT-CV 105HP turret. Referred to as a medium tank by its developers, the vehicle weighs around 25 tons with a 3-man crew, and is cheaper to produce and maintain and has better mobility than actual tanks. The vehicle's main role is direct fire support for infantry against armored and soft-skinned vehicles, buildings, and fortifications. The turret has a bustle-mounted automatic ammunition loading system capable of firing 8 rounds per minute and stores rounds in the bustle compartment, separated from the crew. Secondary armament is a coaxial 7.62 mm machine gun plus an optional roof-mounted 12.7 mm machine gun in a remote weapon station. The K21-105 retains the protection level and amphibious capability of the K21 IFV.

Hanwha Defense (previously Doosan DST) now labels the K21-105 as a medium tank.

Future development
Hanwha Defense have proposed a development of the K21 known as the AS21 Redback, equipped with a 30mm caliber automatic cannon for the Australian Army's Land 400 Phase 3 IFV competition. In mid-September 2019, Rheinmetall's Lynx KF41 Infantry Fighting Vehicle (IFV) and Hanwha's Redback AS21 IFV were shortlisted for consideration for the Australian Army’s project Land 400 Phase 3. In 2021, prototype AS21s were delivered to the Australian Army for testing purposes.

Oshkosh Defense is developing a version of the Redback as its entry under a competitive contract for the U.S. Army Optionally Manned Fighting Vehicle program.

As a part of a wider strengthening of Polish Korean cooperation in the armaments sector, in October 2022, The Polish government showed interest in the Redback, in order to replace its obsolete fleet of BMP-1 vehicles. The Polish army has begun testing the Redback in trials in anticipation of a decision to either acquire the vehicle in conjunction with the Polish BWP Borsuk.

Romania has also expressed interested in acquiring the redback for part of its military modernization.

See also
 ASCOD
 Bionix AFV
 BMP-3
 BWP Borsuk
 CV90 IFV
 Dardo IFV
 FV510 Warrior
 M2 Bradley IFV
 Schützenpanzer Puma
 Tulpar IFV
 WPB Anders
 ZBD-97
 Hunter AFV

References

External links

 K21 - Armored Vehicles - Hanwha Defense
 K-21 video
 K-21 on Armour.ws
 South Korea's Deadly Infantry Fighting Vehicle Is a Terror on the Battlefield - National Interest

Infantry fighting vehicles
Tracked infantry fighting vehicles
Armoured fighting vehicles of South Korea
Amphibious armoured fighting vehicles
Military vehicles introduced in the 2000s